Lucheng Subdistrict is one of two subdistricts of Kangding city in Garzê Tibetan Autonomous Prefecture in western Sichuan Province, China. Lucheng Subdistrict serves as the seat of the Kangding city government. As of 2010, the subdistrict has a population of 41,399 people.

Administrative divisions
The subdistrict is divided into four neighborhood committees and ten village committees.

Transport
China National Highway 318

References

Further reading
Dorje, Gyurme (1999). Footprint Tibet Handbook with Bhutan. 2nd Edition. Footprint Handbooks, Bath, England. .
 Forbes, Andrew ; Henley, David (2011). China's Ancient Tea Horse Road. Chiang Mai: Cognoscenti Books. ASIN: B005DQV7Q2
Kendall, Elizabeth (1913). A Wayfarer in China: Impressions of a trip across West China and Mongolia. The Riverside Press, Cambridge. Boston and New York.
Leffman, David, et al. (2005). The Rough Guide to China. 4th Edition. Rough Guides, New York, London, Delhi. .

External links
 Kangding City Government Website

Kangding
Township-level divisions of Sichuan